The Lesbian Body is a 1973 novel by Monique Wittig. It was translated into English in 1975.

Plot

According to Wittig's The New York Times obituary, "lesbian lovers literally invade each other's bodies as an act of love."

Literary significance and criticism

Wittig said "When I came upon the title, Corps Lesbien, the association of these two words made me laugh. It was absurdly sarcastic."

References

Books by Monique Wittig
1973 French novels
French philosophical novels
Feminist novels
Novels with lesbian themes
French LGBT novels
1970s LGBT novels
Les Éditions de Minuit books